Larissa MacFarquhar is an American writer known for her profiles in The New Yorker.

She is the daughter of the sinologist Roderick MacFarquhar. She was born in London and moved to the United States at the age of 16.

MacFarquhar has been a staff writer at The New Yorker since 1998 and has written profiles on Barack Obama, Derek Parfit, Hilary Mantel, Robert Gottlieb, Richard Posner, Chimamanda Ngozi Adichie, Chelsea Manning and Aaron Swartz, among others. Her 2015 book Strangers Drowning: Impossible Idealism, Drastic Choices, and the Urge to Help explores the motivations of people who take altruism to extremes. She is married to the writer Philip Gourevitch.

Selected bibliography

Books

Essays and reporting

References

External links
 Larissa MacFarquhar Profile on TEDMED
 Mercatus Center interview (2019)

1960s births
Living people
21st-century American women writers
The New Yorker people
The New Yorker staff writers